Ain't Gonna Cry is the ninth solo studio album by country pop singer Juice Newton.  It was released by RCA Records in 1989 and was Newton's final album for the label as well as her last album for several years. Though no singles were released to stores, the promotional single, "When Love Comes Around The Bend", peaked at number 40 on the Billboard Hot Country Songs chart on June 17, 1989. The album also contains Newton's cover version of "Then He Kissed Me", a top ten hit for The Crystals in 1963.

Track listing

Personnel
 Mike Baird - drums
 Greg Barnhill - backing vocals
 Richard Bennett - acoustic guitar, electric guitar
 Larry Byrom - electric guitar
 Lenny Castro - percussion
 Gail Davies - backing vocals
 George Doering - electric guitar, acoustic guitar
 Assa Drori - violin
 John Hall - electric guitar, keyboards
 John Hobbs - piano
 Mary Ann Kennedy - backing vocals
 Craig Krampf - drum programming
 Larry M. Lee - backing vocals
 Josh Leo - electric guitar
 Carl Marsh - synthesizer
 Beth Nielsen Chapman - backing vocals
 Mark O'Connor - fiddle
 Dean Parks - acoustic guitar, electric guitar
 John Paruolo - keyboards
 Al Perkins - steel guitar
 Michael Rhodes - bass
 Pam Rose - backing vocals
 Frederick Setkora - cello
 Leland Sklar - bass
 J. D. Souther - backing vocals
 Harry Stinson - drums, backing vocals
 Gerald Vinci - violin
 Wendy Waldman - backing vocals
 Biff Watson - acoustic guitar, keyboards
 Evan Wilson - viola
 Glenn Worf - bass
 Juice Newton - vocals, acoustic guitar

References

1989 albums
Juice Newton albums
Albums produced by Josh Leo
RCA Records albums